Charles Alexander Harvin III (February 7, 1950 – October 11, 2005) was an American attorney and politician who was a state legislator from South Carolina. He was a Democrat.

Born in Sumter, South Carolina, Harvin received his bachelor's degree from Charleston Southern University and his law degree from Augusta Law School. Harvin served in the South Carolina House of Representatives from 1977 until his death in 2005, aged 55 after a long illness and was from Summerton, South Carolina. His wife Cathy Harvin was elected to the seat and served until her own death in 2010 at the age of 56.

References

External links

|-

Democratic Party members of the South Carolina House of Representatives
1950 births
2005 deaths
People from Clarendon County, South Carolina
People from Sumter, South Carolina
Charleston Southern University alumni
South Carolina lawyers
20th-century American politicians
21st-century American politicians
20th-century American lawyers